The Lewis House, also known as Lewis Spring House, is a historic home in Tallahassee, Florida, located north of I-10, at 3117 Okeeheepkee Road.  It was built in 1954. On February 14, 1979, it was added to the U.S. National Register of Historic Places.  It was designed by Frank Lloyd Wright for George Lewis II, President of the Lewis State Bank, and his wife Clifton.   George Lewis gave the name "Spring House" to the home "for the natural spring and small stream that flows from the property." The National Trust for Historic Preservation describes its significance: "The novel hemicycle form of Spring House represents a late, and little-known, stage in Wright’s long, prolific career. Although there are approximately 400 intact houses attributed to Wright throughout the country, only a fraction were from his hemicycle series."

Spring House Institute was formed to protect the house in 1996 but the first work project was not started until January 2013. The Institute is raising funds to acquire, restore, complete, maintain and manage the house as a learning institute, as the original owners, George Lewis II and his wife, Clifton Van Brunt Lewis dreamed their home would one day become.

On April 18, 2012, the AIA's Florida Chapter placed the house on its list of Florida Architecture: 100 Years. 100 Places.

In 2014, the National Trust for Historic Preservation included the house on its annual list of "America's Eleven Most Endangered Places."  Spring House Institute is trying to save it.

References

 Storrer, William Allin. The Frank Lloyd Wright Companion. University Of Chicago Press, 2006,  (S.359)

External links
 
 Leon County listings at National Register of Historic Places
 Leon County listings at Florida's Office of Cultural and Historical Programs
 Spring House Institute (restoration efforts)

Houses on the National Register of Historic Places in Florida
National Register of Historic Places in Tallahassee, Florida
Frank Lloyd Wright buildings
Houses in Tallahassee, Florida
Houses completed in 1954
1954 establishments in Florida